Kalra is an Arora Hindu and Sikh surname originating in the Punjab region.

Notable people with this name include:

Ankur Kalra, Indian cardiologist and entrepreneur
Ash Kalra, American politician
Deep Kalra, Indian businessman
Dipak Kalra (born 1959), British health scientist 
Jai Kalra, Indian film and television actor
Jaspal Inder Singh Kalra, Indian restaurateur, food columnist, television host, and author
Jawahar Kalra (born 1949), Indian-Canadian pathologist and physician
Manjot Kalra (born 1999), Indian cricketer
Monika Kalra Varma, American lawyer
Pawan Kalra (born 1972), Indian voice artist 
Sampooran Singh Kalra, Indian lyricist
Sanjay Kalra, Indian Endocrinologist
Sonal Kalra, Indian journalist and author
Smriti Kalra, Indian television actress 
VD Kalra, Indian actor
Virinder Kalra, British sociologist 
Viveik Kalra, English actor
Zorawar Kalra, Indian restaurateur
Acharya Harmit S. Kalra, Astrologer & Vastu Consultant

See also

Karra (name)

Yadav

References

Surnames of Indian origin
Punjabi tribes
Indian surnames
Punjabi-language surnames
Hindu surnames
Khatri clans
Khatri surnames
Arora clans